A bearing surface in mechanical engineering is the area of contact between two objects. It usually is used in reference to bolted joints and bearings, but can be applied to a wide variety of engineering applications. 

On a screw the bearing area loosely refers to the underside of the head. Strictly speaking, the bearing area refers to the area of the screw head that directly bears on the part being fastened. 

For a cylindrical bearing it is the projected area perpendicular to the applied force.

On a spring the bearing area refers to the amount of area on the top or bottom surface of the spring in contact with the constraining part.

The ways of machine tools, such as dovetail slides, box ways, prismatic ways, and other types of machine slides are also bearing surfaces.

See also
Babbitt, an alloy that covers a bearing surface
Bridge bearing
 Pillow block bearing
 Plain bearing

References

Bibliography
.
.

Bearings_(mechanical)
Mechanical engineering